The R722 is a Regional Route in Free State, South Africa that connects Memel with Harrismith.

Route
Its north-eastern terminus is Memel at an intersection with the R34. It heads south-west to the town of Harrismith, its route ending at the N3.
The gravel road passes the small village of Verkykerskop, and certain passes and steep hills are tarred, but not excluding potholes. From Verkykerskop the road is fully tarred to the N3 (±41 km). Traversing by an LDV (Ford Ranger - double cab) took ± an hour and 10 minutes from Memel to Harrismith (16 June 2016).

References 

 https://www.transport.gov.za/documents/11623/21913/SANoRouteDescriptionDestinationAnalysis.pdf/1c07b3af-099a-4d9a-a72c-f328c706d966

Regional Routes in the Free State (province)